John Rooney (1880 – 17 October 1905) was an American convicted murderer who was the last person executed by North Dakota.

On 26 August 1902, a farm worker named Harold Sweet was shot and killed during a robbery near the Chicago, Milwaukee & St. Paul Railroad tracks on the west side of Fargo, North Dakota. Rooney was arrested and charged with first degree murder. In January 1903, Rooney was convicted by a jury and on 31 March 1903, he was sentenced to death by hanging.

Rooney's appeals went to the Supreme Court of the United States. Rooney argued that because on 9 March 1903, the North Dakota Legislature had changed the law to mandate that all executions should be conducted in a prison rather than in public, the application of his sentence was being applied ex post facto, since no such law existed at the time of the murder. The Supreme Court rejected this argument, holding that "the place of execution, when the punishment is death, within the limits of the state, is of no practical consequence to the criminal."

Rooney was hanged at the state penitentiary in Bismarck on 17 October 1905. It was the first execution in North Dakota's history to be held in a prison as opposed to in public. It was not only the first execution in the state prison, but the last as capital punishment was abolished by the state.  Other condemned prisoners had their sentences reduced to natural life in prison.

North Dakota abolished capital punishment in 1915.

See also
Capital punishment in North Dakota
List of most recent executions by jurisdiction
List of people executed in North Dakota

Notes

References
Frank Vyzralek, Capital crimes and criminals executed in northern Dakota Territory and North Dakota, 1885–1905", 2000-10-19

1880 births
1905 deaths
1902 crimes in the United States
20th-century executions by North Dakota
American people convicted of murder
20th-century executions of American people
People executed by North Dakota by hanging
People executed for murder
People from North Dakota
People convicted of murder by North Dakota